Tian Tian (meaning "Sweetie") is a female panda born on 24 August 2003 at the Beijing Zoo from mother Niu Niu and father Ying Ying, and currently resident at Edinburgh Zoo, Scotland.
She arrived in Edinburgh in December 2011 together with a male panda named Yáng Guāng (meaning "sunshine"). Currently they are the only two pandas in the United Kingdom. They are on a 10-year loan from the Bifengxia Breeding Centre in China at a cost of £640,000 per year.

Pregnancies
When in China Tian Tian, successfully gave birth to twins on 7 August 2009.  The male cub was named Shen Wei and the female Bo Si.
After her arrival at Edinburgh Zoo she had an unsuccessful mating season in 2012.
In April 2013 Royal Zoological Society of Scotland performed on her the first artificial insemination procedure on a giant panda in the UK. They later confirm that Tian Tian had become pregnant, but most likely reabsorbed the foetus late term.
On 12 August 2014 Iain Valentine, Director of Giant Pandas for the Royal Zoological Society of Scotland, announced that a second implantation had taken place, she was pregnant and birth was expected around the end of August 2014. On 22 September 2014 Edinburgh Zoo announced that she was no longer pregnant.
On 26 March 2015 it was announced that a third artificial insemination had taken place but by August 2015 it was believed she had lost the cub.
In October 2015 scientists said they were exploring cloning the pandas at Edinburgh Zoo.

On 24 August 2017 it was revealed that Edinburgh Zoo had believed she was pregnant again after being artificially inseminated for the fifth time in 2016.  The expected date for a birth was as early as 25 August 2017 although the Zoo said was hard to predict and the panda breeding season can last until late September.  On 11 September 2017, the Zoo said that Tian Tian was not pregnant and her hormone levels had returned to normal.

In the media
The coverage of Tian Tian's pregnancies at Edinburgh Zoo became so widespread that BBC Radio 4 current affairs programme PM broadcast satirical daily "Possible Panda Pregnancy Update[s]".

References

External links

Individual giant pandas
Edinburgh Zoo
2003 animal births
China–United Kingdom relations
Individual animals in Scotland